Michael Lamp (born 10 November 1977) is a retired Danish badminton player. He was once the top ten in both men's doubles and mixed doubles rankings. Michael Lamp won the Slovak International in 1997 and the Scottish Open the following year. In 1999 he won the US Open and again the Scottish Open. In 2001 he won the Bitburger Open and in 2003 the Spanish International. He also medalled in World mixed team championships in 2003.

Achievements

IBF World Grand Prix 
The World Badminton Grand Prix sanctioned by International Badminton Federation (IBF) from 1983 to 2006.

Men's doubles

Mixed doubles

IBF International 
Men's doubles

Mixed doubles

References 

1977 births
Living people
Danish male badminton players